Dame Julia Unwin  (born 6 July 1956) was chief executive of the Joseph Rowntree Foundation (JRF) and the Joseph Rowntree Housing Trust(JRHT). The Guardian in 2007 described her as a "major player in the voluntary sector." In 2012 she was appointed by the Scottish Government as a member of the Expert Working Group on Welfare and Constitutional Reform.

Early life
Unwin is the daughter of Peter William Unwin, a retired diplomat. She studied History at Liverpool University and graduated Bachelor of Arts (BA) in 1978. She then went on to undertake postgraduate studies in Social Policy and Planning at the London School of Economics, graduating Master of Science (MSc) in 1991.

Career
She was Chief executive of JRF and JRHT from January 2007 to December 2016. Previous roles include being a freelance consultant between 1993 and 2006 – during this time Julia undertook policy analysis, governance support and project evaluation. She has been a member of the peer review of Cabinet office (2000), a member of the Capability Review at DCLG (2006), Social Policy Adviser at NatWest Bank, and Senior Adviser to the Baring Foundation. She is a member of the Council at the University of York.

Former roles
 1978–1980 Field worker, Liverpool Council for Voluntary Service
 1980 -1982 Community Liaison officer, London Borough of Southwark social services
 1982–1986 Head of Voluntary sector liaison team, Greater London Council
 1986–1992 Director, Homeless Network
 1995–1998 Chair of Refugee Council
 1998–2003 Charity Commission for England and Wales Charity Commissioner
 1992–2001 Board member, Housing Corporation
 2001–2006 Board member, National Consumer Council
 2003–2006 Deputy Chair, Food Standards Agency

In January 2016 Julia was appointed as an independent non-executive Director of Mears Group Plc. In January 2017 she was appointed as a non-executive director at Yorkshire Water. She is also a non-executive director of the Financial Reporting Council. She chaired the independent inquiry into the future of civil society, which concluded and published its findings in late 2018.

Honours 
Unwin was appointed Officer of the Order of the British Empire (OBE) in the 2000 New Year Honours for services to the housing corporation, Commander of the Order of the British Empire (CBE) in 2006 as deputy chair of the Food Standards Agency for services to consumers, and Dame Commander of the Order of the British Empire (DBE) in the 2020 New Year Honours for services to civil society.

She received an Outstanding Leadership Award, at the 2010 Charity Awards. The presenter said "...it's hard to overstate the impact that her work has had on social policy in the UK."

Family life
She is married and has two children. They reside in York, England.

Publications 
 Lending money, the issues for grant making trusts; Julia Unwin; Published by the Baring Foundation; 1995
 Trends, Myths and Realities: Funding Policy and the Local Voluntary Sector; Julia Unwin and Peter Westland; Published by Association of Charitable Foundations; 1996
 Who pays for Core Costs?; Julia Unwin; Published by ACEVO; 1999
 Speaking Truth to Power; Julia Unwin; Published by the Baring Foundation; 2004
 The Grant Making Tango: Issues for Funders; Julia Unwin; Published by the Baring Foundation; 2004
 The Voluntary Sector delivering public services: Transfer or transformation? ; Will Paxton, Nick Pearce, Julia Unwin and Peter Molyneux; Published by the Joseph Rowntree Foundation; 2005
 Fruitful funding: A guide to levels of engagement; Julia Unwin; Published by NCVO; 2005
The role of kindness in public policy; Julia Unwin; Carnegie UK Trust

References

External links 
 jrf.com

Living people
1956 births
Alumni of the University of Liverpool
Dames Commander of the Order of the British Empire
Public housing in the United Kingdom
British chief executives
British charity and campaign group workers
Women nonprofit executives
Fellows of the Academy of Social Sciences